Alpinia petiolata, the stalked-leaved alpinia, is a species of ginger native to Peninsular Malaysia. It was first described by John Gilbert Baker.

References

petiolata